Chaetostoma machiquense is a species of catfish in the family Loricariidae. It is native to South America, where it occurs in the Negro River basin in the Lake Maracaibo drainage in Venezuela. The species reaches 6.6 cm (2.6 inches) SL.

References 

machiquense
Fish described in 1953